Mount Jumullong Manglo (sometimes shortened to Mount Jumullong) is a peak in the south-west of the island of the United States territory of Guam.

Nearby is located the village of Agat.

References

Bendure, G. & Friary, N. (1988) Micronesia:A travel survival kit. South Yarra, VIC: Lonely Planet.

Mountains of Guam